Bachíniva is a town and county in the Mexican state of Chihuahua. The town serves as the county seat for the surrounding municipality of the same name. It was founded by Franciscan missionaries on September 8, 1660, as Santa María de Nativitas Bachiniva. Bachiniva is a Rarámuri native Indian word which means the place of the wild pumpkin flower. With the arrival of the Franciscan missionaries to the area, most natives left their settlement rejecting the evangelization process of the catholic church. Some of the natives however were converted to the new religion and the mission of Santa Maria de Nativitas Bachíniva was founded with a church that still stands today. Later on, Spanish immigrants and Mexican from the south of Mexico settled in the area along the fertile lands of the Santa Maria River. The Spanish missionaries found the area ideal for the growing and production of apples and they planted the first apple trees in the late 1600s and ever since the people of this municipality have been growing great apple crop along with other fruits and agricultural products. The apple production though is the main economic activity of the Bachiniva municipality.

As of 2020, the town of Bachíniva had a population of 5,807.

References

 Bachiniva, Antigua Mision Franciscana, Mons, Carlos Francisco Enriquez Merino, 1986.

Populated places in Chihuahua (state)
Populated places established in 1660
1660 establishments in New Spain
1660s establishments in Mexico